This was the first edition of the tournament.

Jean-Julien Rojer and Horia Tecău won the title, defeating Sam Groth and Chris Guccione in the final, 6–4, 7–6(7–4).

Seeds

Draw

Draw

References
 Main Draw

ATP Shenzhen Open - Doubles
2014 Doubles